Quade is both a surname and a given name. Notable people with the name include:

People with the surname
Edward Schaumberg Quade, mathematician
Jack Quade, fictional character in the Australian medical drama All Saints
John Quade (1938–2009), American character actor who starred in film and in television
Mary Quade (born 1971), American poet and essayist
Mike Quade (born 1957), manager of the Chicago Cubs
Ricky Quade (born 1950), former Australian rules footballer who played with South Melbourne in the VFL during the 1970s

People with the given name
Quade Cooper (born 1988), Australian rugby union player for the Queensland Reds
Quade Winter (born 1951), American composer, musical restorer and translator, specializing in the light operas of Victor Herbert

See also
Quaade
Quaid (disambiguation)
Quad (disambiguation)